North Oaks is an unincorporated community in Lancaster Township, Wells County, in the U.S. state of Indiana.

Geography

References

Unincorporated communities in Wells County, Indiana
Unincorporated communities in Indiana
Fort Wayne, IN Metropolitan Statistical Area